Iran participated at the 2018 Summer Youth Olympics in Buenos Aires, Argentina.

Competitors

Medal summary

 
|  style="text-align:left; width:78%; vertical-align:top;"|

| width="22%" align="left" valign="top" |

Results by event

3x3 basketball

Girls

Girls

Aquatics

Swimming

Boys

Archery

Boys' recurve

Girls' recurve

Mixed recurve

Athletics

Boxing

Boys

Canoeing

Iran qualified two boats based on its performance at the 2018 World Qualification Event.

 Boys' C1 – 1 boat
 Girls' C1 – 1 boat

Equestrian

Iran qualified a rider based on its ranking in the FEI World Jumping Challenge Rankings.

 Individual Jumping – 1 athlete
Summary

Fencing

Boys

Futsal

Summary

Team roster

Group stage

Gymnastics

Artistic
Iran qualified one gymnasts based on its performance at the 2018 Asian Junior Championship.

 Boys' artistic individual all-around – 1 quota

Boys

Multidiscipline

Judo

Individual

Karate

Iran qualified five athletes based on its performance at one of the Karate Qualification Tournaments.

 Boys' −61 kg – Alireza Faraji
 Boys' +68 kg – Navid Mohammadi
 Girls' −53 kg – Fatemeh Khonakdar
 Girls' −59 kg – Mobina Heidari
 Girls' +59 kg – Negin Altooni

Rowing

Iran qualified one boat based on its performance at the 2018 Asian Youth Olympic Games Qualification Regatta.

 Girls' single sculls – 1 athlete

Shooting

Individual

Team

Table tennis

Taekwondo

Boys

Girls

Weightlifting

Boys

Wrestling

Boys' freestyle

Boys' Greco-Roman

References

Nations at the 2018 Summer Youth Olympics
2018 in Iranian sport
Iran at the Youth Olympics